This is a list of Polish government-owned companies:
 Centrala Zbytu Węgla Węglozbyt S.A.
 Centralna Stacja Ratownictwa Górniczego SA.
 Centrum Badań i Dozoru Górnictwa Podziemnego Sp. z o.o
 Elektrociepłownia Będzin S.A.
 ENEA S.A.
 ENERGA SA.
 Fabryka Elementów Złącznych S.A.
 Fabryka Przewodów Energetycznych S.A.
 Grupa LOTOS S.A.
 HUTA ŁABĘDY S.A.
 HUTMAR S.A.
 Instytut Automatyki Systemów Energetycznych Sp. z o.o.
 Jastrzębska Spółka Węglowa S.A.
 Jastrzębskie Zakłady Remontowe Sp. z o.o.
 JSW KOKS S. A.
 Katowicki Holding Węglowy S.A.
 KGHM Polska Miedź S.A.
 Kopalnia Soli Wieliczka S.A.
 Kopalnia Soli Bochnia Sp. z o.o.
 Kopalnie Surowców Mineralnych KOSMIN Sp. z o.o.
 LOTOS PETROBALTIC S.A.
 PGE Polska Grupa Energetyczna S.A. PGE Capital Group
 Polska Grupa Górnicza Sp. z o.o.
 Polski Koncern Naftowy ORLEN S.A.
 Polskie Górnictwo Naftowe i Gazownictwo S.A.
 Przedsiębiorstwo Przeładunku Paliw Płynnych NAFTOPORT Sp. z o.o. 
 PSK Rzeszów Sp. z o.o.
 SIARKOPOL Gdańsk S.A.
 Spółka Restrukturyzacji Kopalń S.A.
 Rafineria Nafty GLIMAR S.A.
 Regionalny Fundusz Gospodarczy S.A.
 TAURON Polska Energia S.A.
 Towarzystwo Finansowe Silesia Sp. z o.o.
 Walcownia Metali Nieżelaznych ŁABĘDY SA.
 Wałbrzyskie Zakłady Koksownicze Victoria S.A.
 Węglokoks S.A.
 Zakłady Urządzeń Chemicznych i Armatury Przemysłowej CHEMAR S.A.
 Zarządca Rozliczeń S.A.
 Zespół Elektrowni Wodnych Niedzica S.A.
 C.Hartwig Gdynia S.A.
 Centrum Techniki Okrętowej S.A.
 Chłodnia Szczecińska Sp. z o.o.
 DALMOR S.A.
 Polska Żegluga Bałtycka S.A.
 Polski Rejestr Statków S.A.
 Polskie Ratownictwo Okrętowe w Gdyni Sp. z o.o.
 Przedsiębiorstwo Budownictwa Hydrotechnicznego ODRA 3 Sp. z o.o.
 Przedsiębiorstwo Budownictwa Wodnego w Warszawie S. A.
 Przedsiębiorstwo Budownictwa Wodnego w Tczewie Sp. z o.o.
 Centrum Logistyczne GRYF Sp. z o.o.
 Przedsiębiorstwo Robót Czerpalnych i Podwodnych Sp. z o.o.
 Stocznia Gdańska S.A.
 Stocznia Gdynia S.A.
 STOCZNIA SZCZECIŃSKA NOWA Sp. z o.o.
 Stocznia Szczecińska Porta Holding S.A.
 Zarząd Morskich Portów Szczecin i Świnoujście S.A.
 Zarząd Morskiego Portu Gdańsk S.A.
 Zarząd Morskiego Portu Gdynia S.A.
 PKP Polskie Linie Kolejowe S.A.
 PKS-IWOPOL Sp. z o.o.
 POLBUS-PKS Sp. z o.o. 
 Centrum Biurowe Plac Grunwaldzki S.A.
 Dolnośląskie Zakłady Usługowo -Produkcyjne DOZAMEL Sp. z o.o. 
 Drogowa Trasa Średnicowa S.A.
 Gryf Nieruchomości Sp. z o.o.
 Nadwiślańska Spółka Mieszkaniowa Sp. z o.o.
 Nowe Centrum Administracyjne Sp. z o.o.
 OPAKOMET S.A.
 Ośrodek Badawczy Ekonomiki Transportu Sp. z o.o.
 PKS Mrągowo Sp. z o.o.
 PKS Nowy Targ Sp. z o.o.
 Poczta Polska S.A.
 Polski Holding Nieruchomości S.A.
 Polskie Koleje Państwowe S.A.
 Przedsiębiorstwo Budownictwa Przemysłowego CHEMOBUDOWA-KRAKÓW S.A.
 Przedsiębiorstwo Budowy Tras Komunikacyjnych TRAKT w Szczecinie Sp. z o.o.
 Przedsiębiorstwo Drogowo-Mostowe S.A.
 Przedsiębiorstwo Komunikacji Samochodowej
 Przedsiębiorstwo Państwowej Komunikacji Samochodowej w Zgorzelcu Sp. z o.o.
 Przedsiębiorstwo Przewozu Towarów Powszechnej Komunikacji Samochodowej S. A
 WARS S.A.
 Warszawski Holding Nieruchomości S.A.
 Wojewódzkie Przedsiębiorstwo Robót Drogowych S.A.
 Zakłady Chemiczne JELCHEM S.A.
 Zakłady Naprawcze Taboru Kolejowego w Oleśnicy S.A.
 Tomaszowskie Przedsiębiorstwo Budowlane TOMBUD S.A.

 Polska Agencja Prasowa S.A.
 Polskie Pracownie Konserwacji Zabytków S.A.
 Polskie Radio S.A.
 Przedsiębiorstwo Wydawnicze RZECZPOSPOLITA Sp. z o.o.
 Techfilm Sp. z o.o.
 Telewizja Polska S.A.
 Stomil-Poznań S.A.
 Huta Stalowa Wola S.A.
 MESKO S.A.
 Ośrodek Badawczo-Rozwojowy Centrum Techniki Morskiej S.A.
 Ośrodek Badawczo-Rozwojowy Przemysłu Oponiarskiego STOMIL Sp. z o. o.
 Polska Grupa Zbrojeniowa S.A.
 Polski Holding Obronny Sp. z o.o.
 ROSOMAK S.A.
 Stocznia Marynarki Wojennej S.A.
 Wojskowe Biuro Projektów Budowlanych Sp. z o.o.
 Wojskowe Centralne Biuro Konstrukcyjno-Technologiczne S.A.
 Wojskowe Przedsiębiorstwo Handlowe Sp. z o.o.
 Wojskowe Zakłady Elektroniczne S.A.
 Wojskowe Zakłady Inżynieryjne S.A.
 Wojskowe Zakłady Kartograficzne Sp. z o.o.
 Wojskowe Zakłady Lotnicze
 Wojskowe Zakłady Łączności
 Wojskowe Zakłady Motoryzacyjne S.A.
 Wojskowe Zakłady Uzbrojenia S.A.
 Zakłady Chemiczne NITRO-CHEM S.A. 
 Zakład Przemysłu Odzieżowego CORA-TEX w Krasnymstawie S.A.
 Lubelski Rynek Hurtowy S.A.
 Rolno-Spożywczy Rynek Hurtowy S.A.
 Warszawski Rolno-Spożywczy Rynek Hurtowy S.A.
 Zielonogórski Rynek Rolno-Towarowy S.A.
 Beskidzki Hurt Towarowy S.A.
 Chłodnia Białystok S.A.
 Dolnośląskie Centrum Hurtu Rolno-Spożywczego S.A.
 Krajowa Spółka Cukrowa
 Małopolski Rynek Hurtowy

 Podkarpackie Centrum Hurtowe AGROHURT S.A.
 Podlaskie Centrum Rolno-Towarowe S.A.
 Pomorskie Hurtowe Centrum Rolno -Spożywcze S.A.
 Przedsiębiorstwo Przemysłu Ziemniaczanego Trzemeszno Sp. z o.o.
 Rolno-Przemysłowy Rynek Hurtowy GIEŁDA HURTOWA S.A.
 Rolno-Spożywczy Rynek Hurtowy Giełda Elbląska S.A.
 Stacja Hodowli i Unasieniania Zwierząt Sp. z o.o.
 Wałbrzyski Rynek Hurtowy S.A.
 Wielkopolska Gildia Rolno-Ogrodnicza S.A.
 Wielkopolskie Centrum Hodowli i Rozrodu Zwierząt w Poznaniu z siedzibą w Tulcach Sp. z o.o.
 Zakłady Przemysłu Ziemniaczanego w Pile ZETPEZET Sp. z o.o.
 ARELAN S.A.
 BINGO CENTRUM Sp. z o.o.
 Centrum Handlowe Wschód S.A. 
 DRAGMOR Sp. z o.o.
 INOFAMA S.A.
 KORONKI S.A. 
 POL-DRÓG Chojnice Sp. z o.o.
 POLMO GNIEZNO Sp. z o.o.
 PZZ AGRO-PIAST S.A.
 SPOMASZ Bełżyce S.A.
 SUPON USŁUGI Sp. z o.o.
 Uzdrowisko Rabka S.A.
 Agencja Kapitałowo-Rozliczeniowa S.A.
 Agencja Rozwoju Przemysłu S.A.
 Agencja Rozwoju Regionalnego S.A.
 Agencja Rozwoju Rolnictwa i Przemysłu Przetwórczego Regionu Raciborskiego S.A.

 AUTOSAN S.A.
 BEZETEN S.A.
 BGE S.A.
 Bielskie Przedsiębiorstwo Instalacji Sanitarnych BEPIS S.A.

 BIS-SUKCES Sp. z o.o.

 BondSpot S.A.
 Bydgoskie Zakłady Przemysłu Gumowego STOMIL S.A.

 CEFARM-RZESZOW S.A.
 Cegielnie Kutnowskie Sp. z o.o.
 Centrala Farmaceutyczna CEFARM S.A. 
 Centralny Ośrodek Badawczo Rozwojowy Aparatury Badawczej i Dydaktycznej COBRABID) Sp. z o.o.
 Centrum Badawczo-Konstrukcyjne Obrabiarek Sp. z o.o.
 Centrum Produkcyjne Pneumatyki PREMA S. A.
 Chemia Polska Sp. z o.o.
 Chłodnia MORS-WOLA Sp. z o.o.
 CHMIEL POLSKI S.A.
 Cieszyńska Drukarnia Wydawnicza Sp. z o.o.
 Daewoo Motor Polska Sp. z o.o.
 Dolnośląskie Konsorcjum Handlowo-Finansowe S.A.
 Dom Hutników w Skierniewicach Sp. z o.o.
 DOM POLSKI S.A.
 Drukarnia Narodowa S.A.
 EHN S.A.
 ELEKTRIM - MEGADEX S.A.

 Elektromontaż Gdańsk S.A.

 ENERGOPOL-TRADE-INSTAL SA.
 EUROLOT S.A.
 Fabryka Aparatury Elektromedycznej Famed Łódź SA
 Fabryka Łączników Radom S.A.

 Fabryka Maszyn Introligatorskich INTROMA Sp. z o.o.
 Fabryka Maszyn w Leżajsku Sp. z o.o.
 Fabryka Obrabiarek do Drewna Sp. z o.o.
 Fabryka Przyrządów i Uchwytów BISON -BIAL S.A.

 Fabryka Szlifierek FAS Głowno Sp. z o.o.
 Fabryka Żarówek HELIOS Sp. z o.o.
 FAGUM-STOMIL S.A.
 Federal-Mogul BIMET S.A.
 FP SPOMAX S.A. z
 Fundusz Rozwoju Spółek S.A.
 Giełda Papierów Wartościowych w Warszawie S.A.
 Grupa Azoty Kopalnie i Zakłady Chemiczne Siarki SIARKOPOL
 GRUPA AZOTY S.A.
 Grupa Azoty Zakłady Azotowe Puławy S.A.
 Grupa Azoty Zakłady Chemiczne Police S.A.
 H.CEGIELSKI-POZNAŃ S.A.
 HOLAGRA Sp. z o.o.
 Hotele Olsztyn Sp. z o.o.
 Huta Kościuszko S.A.
 Huta BATORY S.A.

 Huta Metali Nieżelaznych
 Huta Ostrowiec S.A.
 Huta Szkła Artystycznego ZĄBKOWICE S.A.
 Huta Szkła Gospodarczego ZAWIERCIE SA
 Instytut Wzornictwa Przemysłowego Sp. z o.o.
 INWESTSTAR S.A.

 Kama Foods S.A.
 Kancelaria Gospodarcza ADIUTOR Sp. z o.o. 
 Katowicka Specjalna Strefa Ekonomiczna S.A.
 Gremi Inwestycje S.A.
 Kieleckie Kopalnie Surowców Mineralnych S.A.
 KOFAMA Koźle S.A.
 Kombinat Budowlany Kołobrzeg Sp. z o.o.
 Kopalnie Odkrywkowe Surowców Drogowych Sp. z o.o.

 Korporacja Ubezpieczeń Kredytów Eksportowych S.A.
 Kostrzyńsko-Słubicka Specjalna Strefa Ekonomiczna S.A.
 Krajowy Depozyt Papierów Wartościowych S.A.
 Krakowski Park Technologiczny Sp. z o.o.
 Krakowskie Centrum Komunikacyjne Sp. z o.o.
 Krośnieńskie Huty Szkła KROSNO S.A.
 KRZYWA S.A.
 Laboratorium Inteligentnego Miasta i Innowacyjnej Gospodarki S.A.
 Legnicka Specjalna Strefa Ekonomiczna S.A.
 LEN S.A.
 LOGOTEC ENGINEERING S.A.
 LS Airport Services S.A.
 LUBINEX Sp. z o.o.
 Lubuskie Fabryki Mebli S.A.
 Łambinowicka Fabryka Maszyn Celpa S.A.
 Łódzka Specjalna Strefa Ekonomiczna S.A.
 Marina Hotele Service Sp. z o.o.
 MAXER S.A.
 Mazowieckie Konsorcjum Autostradowe S.A.
 Meprozet Kościan S.A.
 METALCHEM Sp. z o.o.
 METRON - NIGA Sp. z o.o.

 METRON-TERM Sp. z o.o.
 Miejskie Przedsiębiorstwo Wodociągów i Kanalizacji Sp. z o.o.
 Międzynarodowa Korporacja Gwarancyjna Sp. z o.o.
 Nakielskie Zakłady Maszyn i Urządzeń Gastronomicznych SPOMASZ - Nakło Sp. z o.o.

 Opolskie Zakłady Przemysłu Lniarskiego LINOPŁYT S.A.
 Piastowskie Zakłady Przemysłu Gumowego STOMIL Sp. z o.o.
 PKO BP S.A.
 POLANIA Sp. z o.o.
 Pol-Mot Holding S.A.
 Polska Agencja Inwestycji i Handlu S.A.
 Polski Fundusz Rozwoju S.A.
 Polski Monopol Loteryjny Sp. z o.o.
 Polskie Centrum Badań i Certyfikacji S.A.
 Polskie Centrum Operacji Kapitałowych Sp. z o.o.
 Polskie Linie Lotnicze LOT S.A.
 Polskie Nagrania Sp. z o.o.
 Pomorska Agencja Rozwoju Regionalnego S.A.
 Pomorska Specjalna Strefa Ekonomiczna Sp. z o.o.

 Pralnia Centralna Sp. z o.o.
 PREFBET SA

 Przedsiębiorstwo Przemysłu Bawełnianego ZAMTEX S.A.

 Przedsiębiorstwo Ceramiki Budowlanej Sp. z o.o.
 Przedsiębiorstwo Gospodarki Materiałowej Przemysłu Węglowego Sp. z o.o.
 Przedsiębiorstwo Handlowe Agroma Sp. z o.o. 

 Przedsiębiorstwo Inżynierii Środowiska i Melioracji w Wągrowcu sp. z o.o.
 Przedsiębiorstwo Nasiennictwa Ogrodniczego i Szkółkarstwa w Ożarowie Mazowieckim S.A.
 Przedsiębiorstwo Obrotu Samochodami i Częściami Zamiennymi POLMOZBYT JELCZ S.A.
 Przedsiębiorstwo Obrotu Wyrobami Hutniczymi CENTROSTAL S.A.
 Przedsiębiorstwo Produkcji i Hodowli Ryb Słodkowodnych w Krakowie Sp. z o.o.
 Przedsiębiorstwo Produkcji Materiałów i Prefabrykatów Budowlanych  WIPRO S.A.
 Przedsiębiorstwo Produkcyjno-Handlowe HORN Sp. z o.o.

 Przedsiębiorstwo Przemysłowo-Handlowe Nida Sp. z o.o.
 Przedsiębiorstwo Przemysłu Zbożowo-Młynarskiego PZZ S.A.
 PRZEDSIĘBIORSTWO ROBOT DROGOWYCH DROMOS Sp. z o.o.
 Przedsiębiorstwo Spedycji Międzynarodowej C. Hartwig Warszawa S.A.

 Przedsiębiorstwo Usług Hotelarskich PUH Sp. z o.o.
 Przedsiębiorstwo Zaopatrzenia Szkół CEZAS Sp. z o.o. 
 Przedsiębiorstwo Zaopatrzenia Szkół Cezas Sp. z o.o. 
 Przemysłowy Instytut Maszyn Budowlanych Sp. z o.o.
 Przędzalnia Czesankowa ELANEX S.A.

 Przędzalnia Zawiercie S.A.
 RAPZ Sp. z o.o.
 Regnon S.A.
 Rzeszowskie Zakłady Graficzne S.A.
 SKLEJKA ORZECHOWO S.A.
 Specjalna Strefa Ekonomiczna Starachowice S.A.
 Specjalna Strefa Ekonomiczna Małej Przedsiębiorczości S.A.
 Stilna S.A.
 Strzegomskie Zakłady Mechaniczne ZREMB S.A.

 Suwalska Specjalna Strefa Ekonomiczna S.A.
 Szczecińska Wytwórnia Wódek POLMOS S.A.
 Szczecińskie Zakłady Zbożowo-Młynarskie PZZ S.A.
 Tarchomińskie Zakłady Farmaceutyczne Polfa S.A. 
 Termoizolacja Centrum Sp. z o.o.
 TEXTILIMPEX Sp. z o.o.
 Tłocznia Metali Pressta S.A.
 Tomaszowskie Kopalnie Surowców Mineralnych BIAŁA GÓRA Sp. z o.o.
 TONSIL S.A.
 Totalizator Sportowy Sp. z o.o.
 Tradecom S.A.
 UML Development Sp. z o.o.
 UMCON Sp. z o.o.
 Unimor Radiocom Sp. z o.o.
 UNITRA-UNIZET Sp. z o.o.
 Uzdrowisko Krynica - Żegiestów S.A.
 Veolia Południe Sp. z o.o.
 Vossloh Cogifer Polska Sp. z o.o.
 Wałbrzyska Specjalna Strefa Ekonomiczna INVEST PARK Sp. z o.o.
 WARMIA S. A.
 Warmińsko-Mazurska Specjalna Strefa Ekonomiczna S.A.
 Warszawskie Przedsiębiorstwo Budowlane Sp. z o.o.
 Warszawskie Zakłady Mechaniczne PZL-WZM w Warszawie S.A. 
 Warszawskie Zakłady Sprzętu Ortopedycznego S.A.
 WELUX S.A
 WISKORD S.A.

 WMB w Pyskowicach S.A.
 Wytwórnia Aparatury Wtryskowej PZL-Mielec Sp. z o.o. 
 Wytwórnia Silników Wysokoprężnych ANDORIA S.A.
 Wytwórnia Sprzętu Komunikacyjnego PZL Krosno S.A.
 Wytwórnia Surowic i Szczepionek BIOMED Sp. z o.o.
 Zakład Naprawczy Mechanizacji Rolnictwa Sp. z o.o.
 Zakład Produkcyjno-Handlowy Artykułów Gospodarstwa Domowego MĘSKO - AGD Sp. z o.o.
 Zakład Tworzyw Sztucznych ARTGOS S.A.
 Zakład Utrzymania Ruchu PZL-Mielec Sp. z o.o. 
 Zakłady Artykułów Technicznych ARTECH Sp. z o.o.
 Zakłady Ceramiczne BOLESŁAWIEC w Bolesławcu Sp. z o.o.
 Zakłady Chemiczne RUDNIKI S.A.

 Zakłady Elektroniczne WAREL S.A. 
 Zakłady Futrzarskie Kurów 1 S.A.
 Zakłady Górniczo-Hutnicze Bolesław S.A.
 Zakłady Górniczo-Hutnicze SABINÓW S.A. 
 Zakłady Górniczo-Metalowe Zębiec w Zębcu S.A.
 Zakłady Maszynowe HAMECH Sp. z o.o.

 Zakłady Mechaniczne Urządzeń Górniczych DEZAM Sp. z o.o.
 Zakłady Metalurgiczne SKAWINA S.A.
 Zakłady Mięsne PEKPOL OSTROŁĘKA S.A.
 Zakłady Mięsne MACKO Sp. z o.o.
 Zakłady Mięsne w Bydgoszczy BYD-MEAT S.A.
 Zakłady Mięsne w Grodzisku Wielkopolskim Sp. z o.o.
 Zakłady Mięsne w Kępnie SA
 Zakłady Płyt Pilśniowych Czarna Woda S. A.

 Zakłady Przemysłu Lniarskiego LENWIT Sp. z o.o.
 Zakłady Przemysłu Pasmanteryjnego LENORA Sp. z o.o.

 Zakłady Przemysłu Wełnianego 9 MAJA S. A.
 Zakłady Przemysłu Wełnianego Krepol S.A.

 Zakłady Sprzętu Precyzyjnego Niewiadów S.A.
 Zakłady Tekstylno-Konfekcyjne Teofilów S.A.
 Zakłady Tkanin Wełnianych MAZOVIA S.A.
 Zakłady Tworzyw Sztucznych Pronit S.A.
 Zakłady Tytoniowe w Lublinie S.A.
 Zakłady Wyrobów Kamionkowych MARYWIL S.A.
 ZMK S.A.
 Gliwicka Agencja Turystyczna S.A.
 Narodowe Centrum Sportu - Rozliczenia Spółka z ograniczoną odpowiedzialnością
 PL.2012 + Sp. z o.o.
 Polska Agencja Rozwoju Turystyki S.A.
 Wojewódzkie Przedsiębiorstwo Usług Turystycznych Sp. z o.o.
 Polska Wytwórnia Papierów Wartościowych S.A.
 Specjalistyczne Centrum Medyczne S.A.
 Aplikacje Krytyczne Sp. z o.o.
 Siarkopol Tarnobrzeg Sp. z o.o.
 Wrocławskie Centrum Badań EIT+ Sp. z o.o.
 Exatel S.A.
 Zachodniopomorska Agencja Rozwoju Regionalnego S.A.
 BOSACKA DEVELOPMENT PARTNERS Sp. z o.o.
 Śląsko-Dąbrowska Spółka Mieszkaniowa Sp. z o.o.
 Holding KW Sp. z o.o.
 Nieruchomości KW Sp. z o.o.
 Biuro Handlowe CONCRET Sp. z o.o.
 Warmińsko-Mazurska Agencja Rozwoju Regionalnego S.A.
 Zakład Budowy Naczep Sp. z o.o.
 Laboratorium Ochrony Środowiska Pracy Sp. z o.o.
 REK-SWED Sp. z o.o.
 Kosmo Sp. z o.o.

See also

 List of government-owned companies

References

 
Government enterprises
Poland e
Poland